John Lowther (c. 1684 – 1 July 1729) was an English landowner from Ackworth Park.

He was the son of Ralph Lowther and Mary Lawson, and the grandson of Sir John Lowther, 1st Baronet. He was Member of Parliament for the borough of Pontefract from 1722 to 1729, alongside his second cousin Sir William Lowther, 1st Baronet, and died about four months after.

References
Lowther pedigree 2

Members of the Parliament of Great Britain for English constituencies
1680s births
1729 deaths
British MPs 1722–1727
British MPs 1727–1734
18th-century English landowners
John